The Myllysilta (Mill Bridge) is a steel girder bridge crossing the Aurajoki (Aura River) in the middle of the city of Turku in Finland. The bridge was opened on 19 September 2011. Only two of four lanes were first in use, the bridge was totally completed on 29 November 2011, even though some landscaping and stone work were completed in 2012. The bridge connects Turku's IV district to the VII district, and has four westbound lanes, and a sidewalk on northern side.  It is a one-way-route from east to west, while the nearby Martinsilta bridge goes west to east.

The bridge from 1975 to 2010
Myllysilta was demolished in 2010 after a structural failure.

Failure
On 6 March 2010 the bridge was closed due to structural failures of both piers. The City of Turku originally reported that the bridge would remain closed for up to a year for repairs. It was later decided to demolish it and build a new bridge.  In the meantime, Martinsilta functioned as a two-way bridge with two lanes designated for regular travel and one for Myllysilta's diverted traffic.

References

External links

Box girder bridges
Bridges in Finland
Demolished bridges